Lawrence Rondon was a Trinidad and Tobago professional footballer.

As a player, he was involved in Trinidad and Tobago's unsuccessful qualifying campaigns for the 1970 and 1974 FIFA World Cups, the 1969 CONCACAF Championship and the 1975 Pan American Games football tournament.

He died on 29 June 2018.

References

1949 births
2018 deaths
Trinidad and Tobago international footballers
Association footballers not categorized by position
Trinidad and Tobago footballers
Footballers at the 1975 Pan American Games
Pan American Games competitors for Trinidad and Tobago